The 2002–03 Kent Football League season was the 37th in the history of Kent Football League a football competition in England.

League table

The league featured 16 clubs which competed in the previous season, no new clubs joined the league this season.

League table

References

External links

2002-03
2002–03 in English football leagues